A one-hitter (also oney, bat, tay, oney bat, or taster) is typically a slender pipe with a screened narrow bowl designed for a single inhalation, or "hit", of smoke or vapor from a small serving (about 25 mg) of heated cannabis flower, tobacco leaf or other dry, sifted herbal preparation.  It is distinguished from western-style large-bowl pipes designed for strong tobaccos that are burned hot and tasted but not inhaled.  Instead, by properly distancing a lighter flame below the opening, inhalant users operate at vaporization temperatures, minimizing combustion waste and toxicity.

Traditional national varieties of one-hitter pipes have included Native American calumet ("peace pipe"), kiseru (Japan), midwakh (Middle East), sebsi (Morocco) and some narrow chillums (Nepal, India, Jamaica).

A one-hitter has been considered drug paraphernalia in certain regions.

Dugout

Brands of cigarette-sized one hitters for inconspicuous public use are marketed with a rectangular (or sometimes cylindrical) wooden case, known as a "dugout", with two compartments, the larger to store a stash of herb or tobacco and a narrower, cylindrical hole to store the "bat" or pipe.

Modern adaptations from craft-centric companies use fine and rare woods, bone, acrylic, aluminum, steel, titanium, other metals or plastics, adding features such as grinders, poker storage or lighter chambers. Carried in a shirt pocket, they are the tangible "replacement" for a pack of cigarettes when one is eliminating a smoking habit.

See also
 Cannabis smoking
 Chillum (pipe)
 Hashish
 Kiseru
 Midwakh
 Sebsi
 Smoking cessation
 Vaporizer (inhalation device)

References 

Cannabis smoking
Pipe smoking
Drug paraphernalia
Tobacco accessories